Khandip is a village in Gangapur City, Sawai Madhopur district in the state of Rajasthan, India.

Khandip is located along the main railway line from Delhi to Mumbai, accessed via Kota on the rail path from New Delhi. The village's standing population currently exceeds 8000, with the majority of the region's population settled throughout the Lakwad, Lakwar Meena community. Khandip's geographic designation encompasses an area of approximately 5 km2.

Basic facilities

Water
There are 20 government, 24 private resources and 14 hand pumps in the village.
Most of the resources are Deep Tubewells which are dependent on ground water.
Village is also the part of chambal sawaimadhopur nadauti project sawaimadhopur baler schemes.

Schools 
Schools that serve Khandip include:
 Govt Senior Secondary School, near Peer Baba, Khandip
 Vishal Senior secondary school, Chamar Darwaja
 Vikash Adarsh Vidya Mandir Senior Secondary School, Darawaja Chauk
 Indira Vidya Mandir Senior Secondary School, Sotan Chauk

References 

Villages in Sawai Madhopur district